Muggy-Doo is a talking animal character created by Hal Seeger. Originally appearing in comic books, this character soon went on to animated cartoons as part of the 1965 Milton the Monster Show, but did not last long in either venue.

History

Comic books
Muggy-Doo started out as the feline star of a 1953 comic from Stanhall Publishing entitled Muggy-Doo, Boy Cat. He was a screwball character who bought and sold junk for a living and who always wore a loose-fitting yellow T-shirt, the front of which had writing that kept changing to fit his situation (in the style of the Yellow Kid). The comic also included stories starring other characters, such as Elmer the Elk, Orry the Orangutan, and the porcine Stuffy Derma. Also featured was a fez-wearing hound named Osh, who acted as a foil for Muggy, but also appeared in solo stories.

The title lasted only four issues, but at least two of them were reprinted in 1963 by I. W. Publications, under their “Super Comics” label.

Animation
In 1963, Muggy-Doo appeared in the theatrically released animated cartoon Boy Pest with Osh, in which Muggy tried to make money by getting Osh onto a television show.

In 1965, the character was changed considerably — he was now a “boy fox” instead of a cat, and more con artist than screwball — and appeared in six cartoons as part of The Milton the Monster Show (which was another Hal Seeger creation).

References

External links
 Big Cartoon Database entries:
 
 Muggy-Doo, Boy Fox cartoon list
 Excerpt from Boy Pest with Osh, on YouTube

Fictional cats
Fictional foxes
1953 comics debuts
1953 comics endings
Comics characters introduced in 1953
Humor comics
Animated films based on comics
Fictional tricksters
Comics adapted into animated films
Anthropomorphic cats